is the third single by Japanese girl group Nogizaka46, released on August 22, 2012. It debuted in number one on the weekly Oricon Singles Chart. It also reached number one on the Billboard Japan Hot 100. The coupling song "Hito wa Naze Hashiru no ka?" was used as an official theme song for 2012 FIFA U-20 Women's World Cup.

Release 
This single was released in 4 versions. Type-A, Type-B, Type-C and a regular edition. The center position in the choreography for the title song is held by Rina Ikoma.

Track listing

Type-A

Type-B

Type-C

Regular Edition

Chart and certifications

Oricon Charts

Certifications

References

Further reading

External links
 Discography  on Nogizaka46 Official Website 
 
 Nogizaka46 Movie Digest on YouTube

2012 singles
Japanese-language songs
Nogizaka46 songs
Oricon Weekly number-one singles
Billboard Japan Hot 100 number-one singles
2012 songs